Jeanne M. VanBriesen is an American civil engineer who is Vice Provost and the Duquesne Light Company Professor at Carnegie Mellon University. Her research considers the realization of sustainable natural and engineered water systems. She is a Fellow of the American Society of Civil Engineers, Environmental and Water Resources Institute, Association of Environmental Engineering and Science Professors and American Association for the Advancement of Science.

Early life and education 
VanBriesen was born in Pennsylvania. She was a student at Northwestern University, where she first majored in chemistry and then civil engineering. Her doctoral research considered the computational simulation of biogeochemical processes in mixed waste systems.

Research and career 
VanBriesen worked as a high school teacher at Evanston Township High School. She joined the faculty at Carnegie Mellon University in 1999, where she directs the Center for Water Quality in Urban Environmental Systems. Her research considers the sustainability of urban water systems and water cycles in the built environment.

In 2021, VanBriesen was appointed head of the National Science Foundation Division of Chemical, Bioengineering, Environmental and Transport Systems.

Awards and honors 
 2007 Pennsylvania Water Environment Association Professional Research Award
 2009 American Society of Civil Engineers Professor of the Year
 2009 West Chester East High School Hall of Fame 
 2009 McGraw-Hill/ AEESP Award for Outstanding Teaching
 2010 Association of Environmental Engineering and Science Professors Distinguished Service Award
 2011 National Academy of Engineering Armstrong Endowment for Young Engineers Gilbreth Lectureship
 2015 American Society of Civil Engineers Margaret Petersen Award
 2015 Carnegie Science Center Environmental Award
 2015 Carnegie Mellon University Barbara Lazarus Award
 2016 Elected Fellow of the Environmental and Water Resources Institute
 2016 Achievement Rewards for College Scientists Alumni Hall of Fame
 2018 Elected Fellow of the American Society of Civil Engineers
 2019 Elected Fellow of the Association of Environmental Engineering and Science Professors
 2019 PA AWWA Special Recognition Award
 2019 SIGKDD 2019 Test-of-Time paper award
 2022 Elected Fellow of the American Association for the Advancement of Science

Selected publications

References 

Year of birth missing (living people)
Living people
Engineers from Pennsylvania
Northwestern University alumni
American civil engineers
Carnegie Mellon University faculty
Fellows of the American Society of Civil Engineers
20th-century American engineers
20th-century women engineers
21st-century American engineers
21st-century women engineers
American women engineers
Fellows of the Association of Environmental Engineering and Science Professors
Fellows of the American Association for the Advancement of Science